El Sayed Hamdy Hewil (born 1 March 1984) is a retired Egyptian football striker. as well as the Egyptian national team.

He was called up for Egypt for the first time in 2009 for a friendly game against Guinea to be held in Cairo on 12 August 2009. He made his debut with Egypt in that match and played the whole match with a 92nd-minute assist for Egypt's equalizer to make it 3-3. Hamdi finished as the top scorer in the Nile Basin Tournament 2011, scoring 6 goals.

References

External links
 
 

1984 births
Living people
Egyptian footballers
Egypt international footballers
2010 Africa Cup of Nations players
Association football forwards
Petrojet SC players
Al Ahly SC players